Fillmore Township is a township in Iowa County, Iowa, USA.

History
The first elections were held in Fillmore Township in 1852.

References

Townships in Iowa County, Iowa
Townships in Iowa